Cedar Ridge High School may refer to:
 Cedar Ridge High School (Arkansas)
 Cedar Ridge High School (New Jersey)
 Cedar Ridge High School (Hillsborough, North Carolina)
 Cedar Ridge High School (Round Rock, Texas)